Guiuanon Island (or Guiwanon Island) is an island barangay located beside Panubulon Island southeast of Nueva Valencia, Guimaras in the Philippines. The island was affected by an oil spill on August 11, 2006.

See also
 List of islands of the Philippines

References

External links
 Guiuanon Island at OpenStreetMap

Islands of Guimaras